Bishopstown is located in the civil parish of St. Finbar's, Barony of Cork, County Cork, Ireland. It is a southwestern suburb of Cork and is made-up of the townlands of Ballineaspigbeg and Ballineaspigmore (sometimes spelled Ballinaspigmore). It is near the town of Ballincollig, a satellite of Cork City, and is home to a number of schools and colleges,

Though it is sometimes suggested that the name of the area derives from an early 18th-century bishop who built his country residence there, the name can be reputedly traced back further and found in sources dating to the 16th century.

Education
The biggest campus of the Munster Technological University (MTU) is located in the area. The secondary schools of Coláiste an Spioraid Naoimh, Mount Mercy College, and Bishopstown Community School are also located here, along with a number of other schools. Coláiste an Spioraid Naoimh is the biggest secondary school in Bishopstown with over 700 boy students.

Due to its proximity to MTU and University College Cork (UCC), Bishopstown is home to a student population who live in privately rented houses and student apartment complexes.

The 43rd Cork Scout Group is based in Bishopstown, and is a member of Scouting Ireland.

Industry and employment
As a suburban area, Bishopstown has a significant proportion of its population working in Cork City Centre. The suburb has a number of retail centres such as Tesco, Aldi, Dunnes Stores, MTU and a number of restaurants and bars in the centre of Bishopstown.

An IDA Ireland centre and the Cork Training Centre are also in the area, along with local business parks at Sarsfield Road and on Model Farm Road. Companies based there include Boston Scientific.

Sport
Local sports clubs include Bishopstown GAA and Highfield RFC.

Leisureworld Leisure Centre is located in the area, as is Bishopstown Stadium (a training ground for Cork City F.C. and home ground of Cork City W.F.C.).

People
 Michael Bradley, former Irish rugby union player
 Jerry Buttimer, politician
 Brian Cuthbert, Gaelic footballer and manager
 Jimmy MacCarthy, Irish singer-songwriter
 Donncha O'Callaghan, Irish rugby union player
 Brendan O'Connor, journalist and television presenter
 Ronan O'Gara, Irish rugby union player
 Ken O'Halloran footballer, Gaelic footballer
 Jamie O'Sullivan footballer, Gaelic footballer
 Rubyhorse, music group
 Dave Ryan, Irish rugby player
 Timothy Ryan, Irish rugby player
 Michael Shields (footballer), Gaelic footballer
 John Spillane, singer-songwriter
 The Frank and Walters, music group

References

Geography of Cork (city)